UT1 may refer to:

 a form of Universal Time
 a version of Unreal Tournament
 Ultra Trencher 1, submersible robot
 UT1 (Ukraine), television station
 University of Toulouse 1, a French university
 UT1, One of the four telescopes making up the VLT
 Urea Transporter Type A1, a renal membrane transport protein

UT-1 may refer to:
 Yakovlev UT-1 a training aircraft built in the Soviet Union
 The abbreviation for Utah's 1st congressional district
 The Cadet UT-1, an American high-wing prototype glider

See also
 UT (disambiguation)